Sultangazi is one of Istanbul's newer inner-city districts. It was founded as a district proper in 2009 by the "New Local Government Law" in Istanbul, Turkey. To the west are the neighbourhoods of Esenler and Başakşehir, Gaziosmanpaşa is to the south and Eyüp is to the north and east. The district of Gaziosmanpaşa was divided to three districts, and Sultangazi is one of them. One border of the district is formed by the TEM highway. 

Sultangazi is divided into three neighbourhoods: Habibler, Gazi and Sultançiftliği. The name of "Sultangazi" comes from "Sultan" word part of Sultançiftliği (meaning farm of the Sultan) and the neighbourhood of Gazi, with "gazi" the Turkish for a venerated veteran of war. 

This district's population comprises many ethnic minorities, including immigrants from Bulgaria and the former Yugoslavia, the Black Sea region of Turkey, Kurds and Alevis, as well as Turks. Kurdish minority and Alevi people are mostly found in the Gazi neighbourhood, which has become infamous in Turkey after the 1995 riots and more recently during the Gezi Park protests of June 2013.

Sultangazi has 3 precincts, 11 neighbourhoods and 1 village.
Precincts: Sultançiftliği, Gazi, Habibler
Neighbourhoods: 50. Yıl, 75. Yıl, Cebeci, Cumhuriyet, Esentepe, İsmetpaşa, Malkoçoğlu, Uğur Mumcu, Yayla, Yunus Emre, Zübeyde Hanım
Villages: Cebeci (near to Cebeci neighbourhood as 3 kilometres.)

See also
 1995 Gazi Quarter riots

References

Populated places in Istanbul Province
2008 establishments in Turkey
Districts of Istanbul Province